Justin-Michael "Ikaika" Anderson (born February 5, 1978) is an American politician from the state of Hawaii and a member of the Democratic Party. Anderson formerly served as chair and presiding officer of the Honolulu City Council and councilmember for the Honolulu County's District 3 (which includes Waimānalo, Kailua and Kāneʻohe). He is a past vice chair  and former chair of its Zoning and Planning Committee.

In September 2020, Anderson resigned from the Honolulu City Council to care for his grandparents, although he faced some criticism for taking a full-time job with Local 630 soon after resigning. While Anderson announced on September 9 that his resignation would be effective September 23, he had been working for Local 630 part-time since September 1. 

In October 2021, Anderson announced his candidacy for lieutenant governor in the 2022 elections. He previously announced his intention to run for a seat in the U.S. House of Representatives (Hawaii’s 1st congressional district) in the 2014 election but was defeated in the primary election by Mark Takai.

Early life

Anderson was born on Oahu and raised on the windward side of the island by his single mother, Kim. His grandfather, Whitney and his grand-uncle. D.G. "Andy" Anderson, both served in both chambers of the Hawaii state legislature. Though Anderson was adopted by his grandparents at two years of age, he was collectively raised by his grandparents and mother as hānai, a custom in Hawaii.

He attended and graduated from Kamehameha Schools and attended the University of Hawaii at Manoa. He earned Bachelor of Arts degrees in journalism and political science.

Political career

While attending the University of Hawaii at Manoa, Anderson served on the Associated Students of the University of Hawaii (ASUH) Senate. While attending the University of Hawaii, Anderson was the assistant committee clerk for the Hawaii House of Representatives' Judiciary Committee. He worked as a clerk for five legislative sessions.

Anderson launched two unsuccessful Hawaii state legislature attempts. He was elected to the Honolulu City Council in a 2009 special election for the seat of the late Barbara Marshall. Anderson served as Marshall’s legislative assistant and she mentored his political career. He was endorsed by Cliff Ziems, Marshall's husband, to succeed her seat on the city council. He was sworn into office on May 27, 2009. Anderson was a member of Honolulu's Agricultural Development Task Force and was the vice chair of the council as well as the chair of the Zoning and Planning Committee prior to being chair.

He won his reelection in 2012 with about 64 percent of the vote.

In June 2012, the Honolulu Ethics Commission issued a "stern advisory opinion" for Anderson's behavior during a parking incident in December 2010.

In August 2013, Anderson announced he would seek the democratic nomination for the U.S. House of Representatives for Hawaii’s 1st congressional district, which encompasses the urban core of Honolulu. In the 2014 Democratic primary, Anderson received 6.7 percent of the votes, with the nomination going to Mark Takai.

In October 2015, the Honolulu Ethics Commission dismissed complaints against Anderson and other councilmembers over "claims that they failed to disclose gifts from lobbyists before taking critical rail votes."

In May 2018, Anderson (who was chair of the Honolulu City Council's Planning Committee at the time), introduced a bill to demolish large homes built without proper permitting in residential communities. The bill was signed into temporary law for two years on March 13, 2018, putting a moratorium on the homes.

In May 2019, Anderson was unanimously elected as Chair of the Honolulu City Council.

In August 2019, Anderson introduced a resolution to the city council that would allow voters to decide on the elimination of the Honolulu Authority for Rapid Transportation. The bill was deferred.

In May 2019, it was announced that Anderson is in the process of drafting a tax on vacant properties.

Personal life

Anderson is a single father and caretaker for his ʻohana. He has four children: Tianni, JW and twins Kaleb and Kaili.

References

External links
 Ikaika for Hawaii official campaign site
 Official page at the Honolulu City Council
 
 Biography at Ballotpedia

1978 births
21st-century American politicians
Hawaii Democrats
Hawaiian adoptees (hānai)
Honolulu City Council members
Kamehameha Schools alumni
Living people
Native Hawaiian people
Native Hawaiian politicians
University of Hawaiʻi at Mānoa alumni